A Touch of Frost (1987) is a crime novel by, R.D. Wingfield. The series inspired a popular television series of the same name, starring David Jason as the title character, Detective Inspector Jack Frost; a disheveled, unorthodox and caustic police officer.

Plot summary
The murder of a local drug addict, the hunt for a serial rapist, a hit-and-run involving the spoiled son of an MP, and a robbery at a strip joint all have something in common. Detective Inspector Jack Frost has been assigned with the thankless task of investigating them. Fighting the stress and ignoring his mounting pile of paperwork, Frost soon finds himself up against the various manifestations of criminality...

Novel series
 Frost at Christmas (1984, PaperJacks, Toronto)
 A Touch of Frost (1987, PaperJacks, Toronto)
 Night Frost (1992, Constable, London / 1995, Bantam, New York)
 Hard Frost (1995)
 Winter Frost (1999, Constable, London / 2000, Corgi Books, London)*
 A Killing Frost (2008)

The American edition of Winter Frost, published by Bantam Books, initially carried the title of Autumn Frost.

Audio Books
The abridged version of the audiobook is narrated by David Jason. The abridged audio CD is edited by Kati Nicholl, and was published by HarperCollins in 1996. The unabridged version of the audio book is narrated by Robin Browne, and published by Dual Dolphin in 1997. A Touch of Frost audio books are still available as audio cassettes and CDs.

1987 British novels
British crime novels